The following is the list of Tulsa Golden Hurricane football seasons by Tulsa Golden Hurricane football program.

Seasons

1 When in a division, it shows their position within the division otherwise the overall position in the division-less conference.
2 Overtime rules in college football were introduced in 1996, making ties impossible in the period since.

References

Tulsa

Tulsa Golden Hurricane football seasons